The 3rd Directors Guild of America Awards, honoring the outstanding directorial achievements in film in 1950, were presented in 1951.

Winners and nominees

Film

Special awards

External links
 

Directors Guild of America Awards
1950 film awards
1950 television awards
1950 in American cinema
1950 in American television